Gummadi Kuthuhalamma (1 June 1949 – 15 February 2023) an Indian politician. A member of the Indian National Congress and later the Telugu Desam Party, she served in the Andhra Pradesh Legislative Assembly from 1985 to 2014.

Kuthuhalamma died in Tirupati on 15 February 2023, at the age of 73.

References

1949 births
2023 deaths
Andhra Pradesh MLAs 1985–1989
People from Prakasam district
Andhra Pradesh MLAs 1989–1994
Andhra Pradesh MLAs 1994–1999
Andhra Pradesh MLAs 1999–2004
Andhra Pradesh MLAs 2004–2009
Andhra Pradesh MLAs 2009–2014
Indian National Congress politicians from Andhra Pradesh
Telugu Desam Party politicians
Former members of Indian National Congress
Women members of the Andhra Pradesh Legislative Assembly